Chronicles is a compilation album produced by Jon and Vangelis, released by Polydor/Spectrum Music in 1994.

Track listing
 "I Hear You Now" (5:11)
 "He Is Sailing" (6:48)
 "Thunder" (2:14)
 "Beside" (4:07)
 "Birdsong" (1:29)
 "A Play Within a Play" (7:03)
 "And When the Night Comes" (4:37)
 "Deborah" (4:56)
 "Curious Electric" (6:39)
 "The Friends of Mr. Cairo" (Edit) (4:20)
 "Back to School" (4:56)
 "Italian Song" (2:54)
 "Polonaise" (5:25)
 "Love Is" (5:45)

Personnel 
Jon Anderson - vocals
Vangelis - keyboards / synthesisers / programming

Music composed by Vangelis & Jon Anderson
Lyrics by Jon Anderson

Arranged and Produced by Vangelis.

References 

1983 compilation albums
Jon and Vangelis albums
Polydor Records compilation albums